Chutikan Kitwanitsathian (born 9 October 1998) is a Thai BMX rider. She competed in the women's race at the 2020 Summer Olympics.

References

1998 births
Living people
BMX riders
Chutikan Kitwanitsathian
Place of birth missing (living people)
Chutikan Kitwanitsathian
Chutikan Kitwanitsathian
Cyclists at the 2020 Summer Olympics
Asian Games medalists in cycling
Cyclists at the 2018 Asian Games
Medalists at the 2018 Asian Games
Chutikan Kitwanitsathian
Chutikan Kitwanitsathian
Chutikan Kitwanitsathian